Tik Chi-yuen  is a member of the Hong Kong Legislative Council and of North District Council. He is a registered social worker and chairman of the small centrist Third Side party, which he co-founded in 2015, after quitting the Democratic Party, of which he was also a co-founder.

Background 
He was the chairman of the Committee on Home-School Co-operation, member of the Commission on Strategic Development, Council for Sustainable Development and the Commission on Poverty.

In 2008, Tik took part in the social welfare functional constituency election in the 2008 Hong Kong legislative election. But he was defeated by Cheung Kwok Che, the president of the Hong Kong Social Workers General Union.

On 9 September 2015, he quit the Democratic Party after he supported the constitutional reform package which the party opposed and denounced by some party members.

He then founded and is now the chairman of Third Side, a centrist party in Hong Kong.

In 2021, he won a seat in 2021 Hong Kong Election Committee Subsector elections and 2021 Hong Kong legislative election in Social Welfare constituency, making him the only non-Pro-Beijing Legislative Council member in this term.

On 16 February 2022, Tik, along with the other 89 members of the Legislative Council, made a statement of gratitude to Chinese Communist Party general secretary Xi Jinping for his "guidance" in fighting the COVID-19 pandemic in Hong Kong.

In July 2022, Tik attended a seminar to "learn and promote" the spirit of Xi Jinping's important speech.

References

District councillors of North District
Hong Kong social workers
Democratic Party (Hong Kong) politicians
Meeting Point politicians
Living people
HK LegCo Members 1991–1995
HK LegCo Members 2022–2025
Members of the Election Committee of Hong Kong, 2007–2012
Members of the Election Committee of Hong Kong, 2012–2017
1957 births